Hogan Township is an inactive township in Franklin County, in the U.S. state of Arkansas.

Hogan Township has the name of Marcus Hogan, an early settler.

References

Townships in Franklin County, Arkansas
Townships in Arkansas